Manka is a famous stone that lies on an old tomb in the city of Multan, Punjab, Pakistan. 

Manka may also refer to:
Manka, a fictional Czech fairy tale character, wife of robber Rumcajs
Manka, Togo, a village
Manka, a district in Taiwan now known as the Wanhua District
Manka Dhingra, an Indian-American politician